Patrognathus is an extinct genus of conodonts.

Use in stratigraphy 
The Tournaisian, the oldest age of the Mississippian (also known as Lower Carboniferous) contains eight conodont biozones, four of which contain Patrognathus species:
 the zone of Siphonodella quadruplicata and Patrognathus andersoni (upper zone of Patrognathus andersoni)
 the lower zone of Patrognathus andersoni
 the zone of Patrognathus variabilis
 the zone of Patrognathus crassus

References

External links 
 
 

Ozarkodinida genera
Mississippian conodonts
Tournaisian life
Fossil taxa described in 1969
Mississippian first appearances
Mississippian extinctions